Radio Milano-Libertà, also referred to as Radio Milano Libertà or simply Radio Milano, was an Italian-language communist radio station, established in Moscow in 1937, which, during the Second World War, broadcast propaganda to Italy in support of the Italian resistance movement.

Establishment

Radio Milano-Libertà was among a number of Soviet radio stations created prior to and during the Second World War to broadcast communist propaganda to other countries in local languages. They operated from a wing of the headquarters of the Comintern, the Soviet propaganda organisation based in Moscow. Radio Milano-Libertà began broadcasting in 1937 and was operated by Italian expatriates living in the Soviet Union and who were refugees from Mussolini's fascist regime.

Second World War

In June 1941, the Germans invaded the Soviet Union and Stalin adopted the objective of creating a broad anti-fascist alliance across Europe. Palmiro Togliatti, who was General-Secretary of the Italian Communist Party and had been in exile in the Soviet Union, was given responsibility for the Italian radio stations, including Radio Milano-Libertà, in early summer 1941. Adopting the pseudonym of Mario Correnti, Togliatti used the station to broadcast his own impassioned speeches to listeners in Italy encouraging them to rise up and overthrow Mussolini and the fascists.

Although the station was broadcasting from Moscow, it adopted, what was at the time, the innovative strategy of pretending it was operating from Italy. The purpose was to give the impression that the resistance movement within the country was substantial and well organised. In fact, at that stage of the war, the opposite was the case. Although the audience may have been limited in numbers, there is evidence that the illusion was believed. For example, Vatican Radio was forced to declare that it was the only Italian radio station that truly had authority to represent the country's Catholics. Another innovation was that it began presenting itself not as a communist station but as a platform for all Italians across the political spectrum opposed to "fascist tyranny and German vassalage". This formed part of the strategy to create a broad anti-fascist alliance. The broadcasts were re-oriented to popular nationalist themes such as the Risorgimento, Garibaldi, the history of ancient Rome and the nationalist poetry of Leopardi and Carducci. These were interspersed with crude personal insults directed at Mussolini and the fascist gerarchi.

Following the Allied invasion of Italy and subsequent armistice, the fascists retreated to the centre and north of the country to establish the Italian Social Republic, a German puppet state. From September 1943, the resistance movement became more of a reality. In a broadcast on Radio Milano-Libertà on 30 October 1943, Togliatti declared:

The struggle between the partisans and the fascists intensified into the bitter conflict now referred to as the Italian civil war. Radio Milano-Libertà's part in this was to incite the killing of fascist officials and supporters, to disseminate information on where specific fascists lived, how they could be identified and tracked down and to issue intimidating warnings to them. The objective was, in part, to impact the morale of the fascists and to give them the sense of being hunted.

As the Allies succeeded in pushing back the fascists and their German allies, the broadcasts moved from Moscow to Italy with Togliatti returning in April 1944. On the 28 April 1945, with the final defeat of the Germans and the fascists imminent, Sandro Pertini, the Socialist partisan leader in northern Italy, broadcasting from Milan, announced on Radio Milano-Libertà:

See also
 German People's Radio
 Radio Londra

References

Bibliography
 

 
 
 
 
 
  
 

Italian-language radio stations
World War II propaganda radio stations
Radio stations established in 1937
Communist propaganda
Soviet propaganda organizations
Italian resistance movement
Comintern
Radio stations in the Soviet Union
Italy in World War II